Titan (2005 – 31 March 2010) was an American male white Great Dane who was a holder of the Guinness World Record as the world's tallest dog. The previous holder was another Great Dane, Gibson, who measured , and died in August 2009. During the nomination process, Titan, who suffered from several health conditions, fought off competition from a Newfoundland from North Dakota and another Great Dane, from Arizona. On February 22, 2010 Titan was dethroned as world's tallest dog by Giant George, a Great Dane from Arizona.

Biography
Diana Taylor, his owner, was living in Atlanta when she adopted Titan in 2005 from the Middle Tennessee Great Dane Rescue. At the time he was three months old, and was already 55 lbs. She also owns a third dog, a nine-year-old German Shepherd named Diego.

Titan had a number of health problems, including being epileptic, deaf and partially blind. He was trained to respond to commands through touch, although previously when he could see out of one eye, his owner had taught him sign language  and he required acupuncture and chiropractic sessions every three weeks to ease his problems. Because of his size, he was often mistaken by children for a horse or cow.

His owner hopes to use Titan's fame to educate the public about the breed, specifically issues with white Great Danes. Great Danes that are predominantly white are usually deaf and can have a variety of eye problems due to a genetic defect called the "merle gene".

After being named the world's tallest dog on November 13, 2009 he appeared on The Tonight Show with Conan O'Brien.

Titan died March 31, 2010 due to complications resulting from a ruptured intestine.

Nomination
Following the former record holder's death, Gibson, there was a period of nomination to the Guinness World Records. Contenders included Boomer, a Landseer Newfoundland from North Dakota who registered in the race at 180 lbs, 7 feet long and 36 inches tall at the shoulder. Another contender was George, a male Great Dane from Arizona, weighing in at 245 pounds and a height at the shoulder of some 42 inches. However, George's height has been in question since his entry into the competition. Previous pictures showing an accurate measurement of 39 1/8 inches at the shoulder and 43 inches when incorrectly measured at the head have since been removed from his website. George has just been named the tallest dog in the world by Guinness World Records after a judge was sent to verify it, beating out Titan by only a quarter of an inch. However the 2010 edition of the Guinness Book of Records was published on 17 September 2009 listing the former record holder, Gibson, still as the world's tallest dog.

Titan's record was announced on 12 November 2009, which was Guinness World Record Day, when more than 30 records were announced or set. While the charitable work planned by his owner has been slowed due to controversy over the title holder, his owner has managed to make some headway in the development of temporary shelters that will house people and their pets after natural disasters. His owner hopes to use Titan's notoriety to complete the project and then donate no less than five mobile shelters to rescue organizations for deployment when needed.

See also
 List of individual dogs

References

External links

Individual dogs
2005 animal births
2010 animal deaths
Individual animals in the United States